In enzymology, a cysteine-conjugate transaminase is an enzyme that catalyzes the chemical reaction

S-(4-bromophenyl)-L-cysteine + 2-oxoglutarate  S-(4-bromophenyl)mercaptopyruvate + L-glutamate

Thus, the two substrates of this enzyme are S-(4-bromophenyl)-L-cysteine and 2-oxoglutarate, whereas its two products are S-(4-bromophenyl)mercaptopyruvate and L-glutamate.

This enzyme belongs to the family of transferases, specifically the transaminases, which transfer nitrogenous groups.  The systematic name of this enzyme class is S-(4-bromophenyl)-L-cysteine:2-oxoglutarate aminotransferase. Other names in common use include cysteine conjugate aminotransferase, and cysteine-conjugate alpha-ketoglutarate transaminase (CAT-1).

References 

 

EC 2.6.1
Enzymes of unknown structure